You are in the line of fire and they are shooting at you is a 2003 album by Trumans Water, released on the Homesleep label.

Track listing 
 "Rock of Gibraltar" 2:51
 "Some Things Feel Rough" 1:51
 "Fire vs. Ice" 2:03
 "Neither Created Nor Destroyed" 3:02
 "Say Hi to the Lie Machine" 3:31
 "Pry Stag Mile" 2:30
 "Pulverizer Bear" 2:58
 "The Joys of Resistance" 2:33
 "Meteorites for Troglodytes" 3:30
 "Magnetism and Good Credit" 1:47
 "Pony Dress" [Flesheaters cover] 2:33
 "Trapeze Sharks" 3:04
 "Airs Smudgy Blanket" 3:14
 "The Spirit is a Stomach" 2:42
 "When Diet and Exercise Fail" 5:55
 "Cherry Wants Change" 6:27

References

2003 albums
Trumans Water albums